The Episcopal Diocese of Montana is the diocese of the Episcopal Church in the United States of America with jurisdiction over the state of Montana.
It was established in 1904 and has 42 congregations in 26 counties of the state. It is in Province 6 and its cathedral, St. Peter's Cathedral, is in Helena, as are the diocesan offices.

Charles Franklin Brookhart, Jr., a previous bishop, holds a Master of Divinity degree from Lutheran Theological Seminary at Philadelphia and a Doctor of Ministry degree from United Theological Seminary in Dayton, Ohio.

List of bishops
The bishops of Montana have been:
 Daniel S. Tuttle, missionary bishop (1866–1880)
 Leigh R. Brewer, missionary bishop (1880–1904), first diocesan bishop (1904–1916)* William F. Faber, coadjutor (1914–1916)
 William F. Faber (1916–1934)* Herbert H. H. Fox, suffragan, 1920, coadjutor bishop, 1925 (VI Idaho, 1925–1926)
 Herbert H. H. Fox (1934–1939)* Henry Hean Daniels, coadjutor bishop (1939)
 Henry Hean Daniels (1939–1957)* Chandler W. Sterling, coadjutor bishop (1956)
 Chandler W. Sterling (1957–1968)
 Jackson Earle Gilliam (1968–1985)
 Charles Irving Jones III (1986–2001)* Charles L. Keyser, assisting bishop (2001–2003)
 C. Franklin Brookhart, Jr. (2003–2018)
 Martha Elizabeth Stebbins (December 7, 2019-current)

See also

 List of Succession of Bishops for the Episcopal Church, USA

References

External links

St. Peter's Episcopal Cathedral, Helena
Official Web site of the Episcopal Church
Journal of the Annual Convention, Diocese of Montana

Montana
Christianity in Montana
Christian organizations established in 1904
Province 6 of the Episcopal Church (United States)